Megasoma vogti, known generally as the Texas elephant beetle or Texas megasoma, is a species of rhinoceros beetle in the family Scarabaeidae.

References

Further reading

 
 

Dynastinae
Articles created by Qbugbot
Beetles described in 1963